One Tough Cop is a 1998 American action crime film. It was directed by Bruno Barreto and written by Jeremy Iacone. The movie stars Stephen Baldwin as the protagonist and first-person narrator Bo Dietl, a real-life New York City detective who wrote the book that the film is based on. Chris Penn costars as Dietl's partner. Gina Gershon, Mike McGlone and Paul Guilfoyle also play key roles.

Plot summary 

Detective Bo Dietl and his partner investigate the rape and murder of a nun. Meanwhile, Dietl learns that his partner has a gambling problem, and is in debt to loan sharks.

Cast 

 Stephen Baldwin as Bo Dietl 
 Chris Penn as Duke Finnerly 
 Gina Gershon as Joey O'Hara 
 Mike McGlone as Richie La Cassa 
 Luis Guzmán as "Papi", Gunman
 Harvey Atkin as Rudy 
 Paul Guilfoyle as Frankie "Hot" Salvino 
 Victor Slezak as FBI Agent Burt Payne 
 Amy Irving as FBI Agent Jean Devlin 
 Jason Blicker as Philly Nose 
 Bo Dietl as Detective Benny Levine 
 Frank Pellegrino as Lieutenant Frank Raggio 
 Michael Rispoli as Lieutenant Denny Reagan 
 Paul Calderón as Sergeant Diaz 
 Jean Paul as Juano 
 Larry Gilliard Jr. as Curtis Wilkins 
 Philip Akin as Inspector Cheney 
 Nigel Bennett as Inspector Bassie

Reception
One Tough Cop was poorly received by critics. On Rotten Tomatoes, the film holds a rating of 24% from 21 reviews.

References

External links

 
One Tough Cop at the TCM Movie Database
 

1998 action thriller films
1998 films
American action thriller films
Films scored by Bruce Broughton
Films directed by Bruno Barreto
Films produced by Martin Bregman
American police detective films
1990s English-language films
1990s American films